Antonio Zanchi (6 December 1631 – 12 April 1722) was an Italian painter of the Baroque, active mainly in Venice, but his prolific works can also be seen in Padova, Treviso, Rovigo, Verona, Vicenza, Loreto, Brescia, Milano, and Bergamo, as well as Bavaria.

He was born in Este and trained with Francesco Ruschi. His masterpieces were the canvas on the Plague of Venice painted for the Scuola di San Rocco and the ceiling on the Crowning of the Virgin Mary with St. Girolamo Miani (1703) in the Patriarchal Seminary of Venice, next to the Church of Santa Maria della Salute. He also painted a number of canvases for the Venetian church of Santa Maria del Giglio. Among his pupils were Francesco Trevisani and Antonio Molinari.

Works

Alexander Taking the Body of Darius (1660), Palazzo Albrizzi, Venice
Abraham Teaches Astrology to the Egyptians (1665), Santa Maria del Giglio, Venice
Martyr of Saint Julian (1674), St. Julian (San Guiliano), Venice
Crowning of the Virgin Mary with St. Girolamo Miani (1703), Patriarchal Seminary of Venice
Universal Law, Scuola di San Fantin, Venice
Samson and Deliliah
Allegory of Time
Joseph Interprets Dreams, attributed work
Isaac Blesses Jacob
David and Goliath
Canvases at the Santa Maria del Giglio church

The death of Aggripina*

Gallery

Notes and references

Bibliography

Giuseppe Pacciarotti, La Pintura Barroca en Italia (Baroque Paintings in Italy) (2000), Istmo, p. 275, página 275.

External links
Self-Portrait
Antonio Zanchi at the Musel del Prado Online Encyclopedia 

1631 births
1722 deaths
17th-century Italian painters
18th-century Italian painters
Italian Baroque painters
Italian male painters
Painters from Venice
18th-century Italian male artists